Monika Kunkelová (born  in Nitra) is a Slovak wheelchair curler.

She participated at the 2014 and 2018 Winter Paralympics where Slovak team finished on sixth and ninth places respectively.

Wheelchair curling teams and events

Mixed doubles

References

External links 

Profile at the 2014 Winter Paralympics site (web archive)
Profile at the 2018 Winter Paralympics site
Kunkelová Monika | Slovenský paralympijský výbor
 Video: 

Living people
1977 births
Sportspeople from Nitra
Slovak female curlers
Slovak wheelchair curlers
Paralympic wheelchair curlers of Slovakia
Wheelchair curlers at the 2014 Winter Paralympics
Wheelchair curlers at the 2018 Winter Paralympics
Wheelchair curlers at the 2022 Winter Paralympics